KissAnime was an anime-focused file streaming website that hosted links and embedded videos, allowing users to stream or download movies and TV shows illegally for free. It was a sister site to a related manga viewing website, KissManga. KissAnime was described as "one of the world’s biggest streaming anime websites". TorrentFreak reported that the sites had audiences of millions and that for a time, KissAnime was "the most visited pirate site in the world".

History 
The website, as well as KissManga, was shut down on 14 August 2020 after about 8 years of existence (the .com website had been registered in 2012 and a more recent .ru domain in 2016), and it has been suggested this was done due to copyright complaints, and the threat of the new, stricter Japanese laws on online piracy. In 2017 the site was also a target of a subpoena by US company Funimation, which described its actions as aimed at "someone... disseminating infringing content on a MASSIVE scale, for profit."

In 2018 the site was blocked in Australia. It was also blocked in India in 2020, along with other pirate streaming and torrent websites, after a decision by the Delhi High Court in favour of the plaintiff, Disney India. The court order provided for "dynamic" blocking meaning that Disney could ask for further bans on websites violating copyrights other than the ones in the order.

Reactions 
The site has been criticized for its copyright infringement and occasionally for advertising that contained malware, but it has been praised for popularizing anime and manga, and for providing access to content that is not legally available in certain areas, particularly in parts of Europe, Southeast Asia and India. 

Its main site, KissAnime.ru, was shut down on August 14, 2020. One commentator noted that "fans are furious" as "in many countries they really have nowhere to go" for the kind of content that was hosted on the site. Another commentator has described the outcome as both "a major strike to media piracy [and] a blow to the history of anime", noting that the website has also been an archive of rare titles, such as the 1993 original video animation, Battle Angel. Many of the works that have been available on the website can be considered lost, as not only are many titles not distributed legally in many countries, but in some cases, they are only available on physical media, which is subject to degradation over time, and are not possible to legally stream anywhere in the world. Even though the main website has shut down, many mirrors of the original websites still exist.

See also 
 Nyaa Torrents
 Online piracy
 Scanlation

References 

Anime and manga websites
File sharing communities
Defunct websites
Internet properties disestablished in 2020
Internet properties established in 2012
Internet censorship in India